Trochisciopsis is a genus of green algae, in the family Trebouxiaceae.

References

Trebouxiophyceae genera
Trebouxiophyceae
Trebouxiales